Luke Burke (born 22 February 1998) is an English professional footballer who plays as a defender for  club AFC Fylde.

Career

Wigan Athletic
Burke is an academy graduate of Wigan Athletic. He joined the club when he was 11 years old and went on to captain the club's U18 side. In May 2016 he was awarded the Michael Millett Award for Wigan's Academy Player of the Season. The following month he was one of six players from Wigan's academy to be offered a pro contract with the club. Following his performances at youth level the season before, Burke was included, and featured regularly in Wigan's pre-season for the 2016–17 Championship campaign. He made his non-competitive debut against Liverpool and scored his first goal for the club two weeks later in a friendly against Fleetwood. He stood out for Wigan during the pre-season and on 8 August 2016 was handed his debut by manager Gary Caldwell in a 2–1 defeat to Bristol City. On 23 November, Burke signed a contract-extension with Wigan following a string of good performances in the early stages of the season.

AFC Fylde
On 15 February 2017, Burke joined National League side Barrow on a month-long loan, and made his debut on the same day in a 1–0 victory over Macclesfield. He made three appearances for Barrow altogether, including his cup debut in the FA Trophy, before returning to Wigan. Following his return, he featured in three Cup matches before joining AFC Fylde on loan, initially on a six-month loan. The loan was later extended until the end of the season. He was then released by Wigan upon his return to the club whereafter he signed for Fylde on a permanent deal.

Career statistics

Club

Honours
Individual
Wigan Athletic Academy Player of the Season: 2015–16

References

1998 births
Living people
English footballers
Association football defenders
Wigan Athletic F.C. players
Barrow A.F.C. players
English Football League players
National League (English football) players
AFC Fylde players